The 2021 Southeastern Conference baseball tournament was held from May 25 through 30 at Hoover Metropolitan Stadium in Hoover, Alabama.  The annual tournament determined the tournament champion of the Division I Southeastern Conference in college baseball.  The Arkansas Razorbacks emerged for the first time as tournament champions, earning the conference's automatic bid to the 2021 NCAA Division I baseball tournament. 

The tournament has been held every year since 1977 (with the exception of 2020), with LSU claiming twelve championships, the most of any school.  Original members Georgia and Kentucky along with 1993 addition Arkansas and 2013 addition Missouri had previously never won the tournament.  This is the twenty-second consecutive year and twenty-fourth overall that the event has scheduled to be held at Hoover Metropolitan Stadium, known from 2007 through 2012 as Regions Park.

Format and seeding
The regular season division winners claim the top two seeds and the next ten teams by conference winning percentage, regardless of division, claim the remaining berths in the tournament.  The bottom eight teams play a single-elimination opening round, followed by a double-elimination format until the semifinals, when the format  reverts to single elimination through the championship game. This is the eighth year of this format.

Bracket

Schedule

Umpires 

 Tony Walsh
 Jeff Head
 Scott Cline
 Scott Kennedy
 Kevin Sweeney
 Ray Gregson
 Eddie Newsom
 Eric Goshay
 Damien Beal
 Mo Hodges
 Brandon Cooper
 Brian deBrauwere

References

Tournament
Southeastern Conference Baseball Tournament
Southeastern Conference baseball tournament
Southeastern Conference baseball tournament
College sports tournaments in Alabama
Baseball competitions in Hoover, Alabama